Eugen Elishiringa Mwaiposa (23 November 1960 – 2 June 2015) was a Tanzanian CCM politician and Member of Parliament for Ukonga constituency from 2010 to 2015.

Education
Born in the Kilimanjaro Region of Tanzania, Mwaiposa commenced her education at Nkweseko Primary School from 1967 to 1974. She graduated from high school in 1985 at Shinyanga Commercial School (Shycom).

She is a graduate of University of National and World Economy previously known as Higher Economics Institute "Karl Marx", in Sofia, Bulgaria where she got her Bachelors in International Economics Relation in 1986 to 1992 and University of Strathclyde in Glasgow where she received her master's degree from 2004 to 2007.

Before politics
Before going into politics, Mwaiposa worked for different branches of CRDB Bank in Dar Es Salaam from 1986 to 2008. Mwaiposa was an entrepreneur who believed in giving women in poverty an opportunity to start small business for themselves. She was the chairperson of Kipunguni SACCOSS which its sole purpose was to supply loans to individuals or group of people who needed capital and it also acted as a bank to secure funds for the community.

She died in 2015.

References

1960 births
2015 deaths
Chama Cha Mapinduzi MPs
Tanzanian MPs 2010–2015
Shinyanga Commercial School alumni
Karl Marx Higher Institute of Economics alumni
Alumni of the University of Strathclyde
University of National and World Economy alumni
Tanzanian expatriates in Bulgaria
Tanzanian expatriates in the United Kingdom